N83  may refer to:
 Carcar–Barili Road, in the Philippines
 , a submarine of the Royal Navy
 London Buses route N83
 N83 road (Ireland)